Patrick-Paul Schwarzacher-Joyce (born 5 July 1972) is an Irish alpine skier. He competed at the 1998 Winter Olympics and the 2002 Winter Olympics. Joyce was born in London, England, to an Austrian father. He was the first skier to represent Ireland at the Olympics.

References

External links
 

1972 births
Living people
Irish male alpine skiers
Olympic alpine skiers of Ireland
Alpine skiers at the 1998 Winter Olympics
Alpine skiers at the 2002 Winter Olympics
Sportspeople from London